Red Wheat is a 1970 Yugoslavian drama film.

Red Wheat may also refer to:
 Red Fife wheat, a wheat variety grown in Canada
 Soft red wheat, hard red winter wheat, or hard red spring, classifications of wheat in the United States

See also
 Wheat (Triticum spp.), grasses grown as cereal grain crops